The Hope Street School is an historic school building at 40 Hope Street in Woonsocket, Rhode Island.  The -story brick school building was designed by Willard Kent and built in 1899 by Norton & Kennedy.  Its western entrance has a wooden portico supported by Doric columns; a similar portico on its eastern entrance was removed.  The building was used as a public school until 1978.

The building was listed on the National Register of Historic Places in 2000.

Alumni
Leah B. Allen, astronomer

See also
National Register of Historic Places listings in Providence County, Rhode Island

References

School buildings on the National Register of Historic Places in Rhode Island
Schools in Providence County, Rhode Island
Buildings and structures in Woonsocket, Rhode Island
National Register of Historic Places in Providence County, Rhode Island